Bolton North East is a constituency represented in the House of Commons of the UK Parliament since 2019 by Mark Logan, a Conservative.

Constituency profile
The seat covers the north part of Bolton town and extends into the West Pennine Moors.

Bolton North East has more often than not to date been a marginal seat between Labour and Conservative candidates. In 1992, Labour's David Crausby came tantalisingly close to gaining the seat, but did not, as his party were expecting to. It would not be until 1997 that Labour gained the seat, with a huge 12,000 majority, holding it for the next 22 years. Altogether, the national statistics collected reflect a socially diverse seat in terms of income; this has been a highly marginal seat when national polls are close, with lower than average social housing, and less deprivation than the average for the metropolitan county.

Boundaries

1983–1997: The Metropolitan Borough of Bolton wards of Astley Bridge, Bradshaw, Breightmet, Bromley Cross, Central, and Tonge.

1997–2010: The Metropolitan Borough of Bolton wards of Astley Bridge, Bradshaw, Breightmet, Bromley Cross, Central, Halliwell, and Tonge.

2010–present: The Metropolitan Borough of Bolton wards of Astley Bridge, Bradshaw, Breightmet, Bromley Cross, Crompton, Halliwell, and Tonge with the Haulgh.

Bolton North East was created for the 1983 general election from parts of the constituencies of Bolton West and the former Bolton East. It covers Bolton's town centre, and the districts in close proximity (Breightmet, Crompton, Halliwell, Tonge with the Haulgh) are Labour-voting areas, whereas the outer suburbs (Astley Bridge, Bradshaw, Bromley Cross) are much more Conservative inclined. Labour comfortably held the seat in 2010, with very little swing from the previous election.

Members of Parliament

Elections

Elections in the 2010s

Elections in the 2000s

Elections in the 1990s

For the 1997 general election the boundaries of the seat were significantly redrawn. The Times Guide to the House of Commons 1997 estimated that had the new boundaries been used for the previous general election rather than being narrowly held by the Conservatives, the seat would have been won by the Labour candidate with a majority of 3,017 over the Conservatives. Thus technically the seat was notionally a Labour hold at this election rather than a gain for the party. The swing above is based on this notional result.

Elections in the 1980s

See also
 List of parliamentary constituencies in Greater Manchester

Notes

References

External links 
nomis Constituency Profile for Bolton North East — presenting data from the ONS annual population survey and other official statistics.

Politics of the Metropolitan Borough of Bolton
Parliamentary constituencies in Greater Manchester
Constituencies of the Parliament of the United Kingdom established in 1983
Parliamentary constituencies in North West England